D120 may refer to:

 D120 road (Croatia), a state road on island of Mljet
 Disdyakis triacontahedron, a 120-sided polyhedron, written as "d120" in dice notation
 Jodel D.120, an aircraft